Vadim Vladimirovich Anokhin (born 2 January 1992) is a Russian male épée fencer.

He took up fencing in 2001 with coach Olga Abrosikova and joined in 2008 the junior Russian national team, with whom he became junior World champion in 2012 and U23 European champion in 2014. In the senior category, he won the 2015 Doha Grand Prix. He was named into the Russian team qualified to the 2016 Summer Olympics as the top épée fencer in national rankings.

References

External links
 
  (archive)
  (archive)
 
 
 

1992 births
Living people
Russian male épée fencers
Olympic fencers of Russia
Fencers at the 2016 Summer Olympics
Sportspeople from Kaluga
21st-century Russian people